T. Narasapuram is a village in Eluru district of the Indian state of Andhra Pradesh.

References

Villages in Eluru district